Kyrgyzstan participated at the 2006 Asian Games held in Doha, Qatar from December 1 to December 15, 2006. Kyrgyzstan ranked 28th with 2 silver medals and 6 bronze medals in this edition of the Asiad.

Medalists

References

Nations at the 2006 Asian Games
2006
Asian Games